Beurlenia is an extinct genus of shrimp containing the species Beurlenia araripensis. It is named after the German palaeontologist Karl Beurlen (1901–1985). Fossils of the shrimp were found in the Crato Formation of the Araripe Basin of northeastern Brazil. A study on the anatomy and morphological variation in Beurlenia araripensis, based on data from fossil samples from the Crato Formation (Brazil), was published by Barros et al. (2021).

References

Palaemonoidea
Prehistoric crustacean genera
Early Cretaceous crustaceans
Early Cretaceous animals of South America
Albian genera
Fossils of Brazil
Crato Formation
Fossil taxa described in 1991
Cretaceous arthropods of South America